The 1000 Kilometres of Jarama is a sports car race held at Circuito del Jarama in San Sebastían de los Reyes, Spain.  The race began in 1967, and has been a part of the European 2-Litre Sportscar Championship, World Sportscar Championship, BPR Global GT Series, International Sports Racing Series, European Le Mans Series, and Le Mans Series.

Results

External links
Racing Sports Cars: Jarama archive

 

Recurring sporting events established in 1967